Kessleria inexpectata is a moth of the family Yponomeutidae. It is found in France.

The length of the forewings is 6.5–7.5 mm for males and 5.5 mm for females. The forewings are white with light and dark brown scales. The hindwings are light grey. Adults are on wing in July.

The larvae feed on Saxifraga paniculata. They live within a spinning and may mine the leaves of their host plant on occasion.

References

Moths described in 1992
Yponomeutidae
Moths of Europe